Trnjanski Kuti is a village in Croatia. 

Populated places in Brod-Posavina County